Pumpkin Center is located in White Cloud Township, Nodaway County, Missouri, at an elevation of 1,020 feet, approximately 10 miles south of the Nodaway County seat of Maryville on US Route 71.

This is not to be confused with the Pumpkin Center located in Grant Township, Dallas County, Missouri, which is near the intersection of Missouri Route 64 and Missouri Route 73 off Pumpkin Center Drive about 7 miles north-northeast of Buffalo, Missouri, the Dallas County seat.

No information appears on the origins of the name; however, “Pumpkin Center” as a town name was widely publicized by one Cal Stewart, who was a popular spoken-word recording artist in the late 1890s and early 1900s. He frequently played the character of a gullible individual by the name of Uncle Josh Weathersby who hailed from the fictional town of "Pumpkin Center" or "Punkin Center". The recordings described life in Pumpkin Center, as well as the character's collisions with modernity in New York City. Perhaps as a result, there are at least 31 communities in the U.S. named Pumpkin Center scattered across 16 states, including Alabama (3), Arizona (2), California (2), Florida, Georgia, Indiana (2), Kentucky, Louisiana, Maryland, Missouri (2), Mississippi, North Carolina (3), Oklahoma (4), South Dakota, Tennessee (3) and Virginia (2).

References

Unincorporated communities in Nodaway County, Missouri
Unincorporated communities in Missouri